Tinker, previously stylized as TINKER, is a suite of computer software applications for molecular dynamics simulation. The codes provide a complete and general set of tools for molecular mechanics and molecular dynamics, with some special features for biomolecules. The core of the software is a modular set of callable routines which allow manipulating coordinates and evaluating potential energy and derivatives via straightforward means.

Tinker works on Windows, macOS, Linux and Unix. The source code is available free of charge to non-commercial users under a proprietary license. The code is written in portable FORTRAN 77, Fortran 95 or CUDA with common extensions, and some C.

Core developers are: (a) the Jay Ponder lab, at the Department of Chemistry, Washington University in St. Louis, St. Louis, Missouri. Laboratory head Ponder is Full Professor of Chemistry, and of Biochemistry & Molecular Biophysics;  (b) the Pengyu Ren lab , at the Department of Biomedical Engineering University of Texas in Austin, Austin, Texas. Laboratory head Ren is Full Professor of Biomedical Engineering;  (c) Jean-Philip Piquemal's research team at Laboratoire de Chimie Théorique, Department of Chemistry, Sorbonne University, Paris, France. Research team head Piquemal is Full Professor of Theoretical Chemistry.

Features
The Tinker package is based on several related codes: (a) the canonical Tinker, version 8, (b) the Tinker9 package as a direct extension of canonical Tinker to GPU systems, (c) the Tinker-HP package for massively parallel MPI applications on hybrid CPU and GPU-based systems, (d) Tinker-FFE for visualization of Tinker calculations via a Java-based graphical interface, and (e) the Tinker-OpenMM package for Tinker's use with GPUs via an interface for the OpenMM software. All of the Tinker codes are available from the TinkerTools organization site on GitHub. Additional information is available from the TinkerTools community web site.

Programs are provided to perform many functions including:
 energy minimizing over Cartesian coordinates, torsional angles, or rigid bodies via conjugate gradient, variable metric or a truncated Newton method
 molecular, stochastic, and rigid body dynamics with periodic boundaries and control of temperature and pressure
 normal mode vibrational analysis
 distance geometry including an efficient random pairwise metrization
 building protein and nucleic acid structures from sequence
 simulated annealing with various cooling protocols
 analysis and breakdown of single point potential energies
 verification of analytical derivatives of standard and user defined potentials
 location of a transition state between two minima
 full energy surface search via a Conformation Scanning method
 free energy calculations via free energy perturbation or weighted histogram analysis
 fitting of intermolecular potential parameters to structural and thermodynamic data
 global optimizing via energy surface smoothing, including a Potential Smoothing and Search (PSS) method

Awards 
 Tinker-HP received the 2018 Atos-Joseph Fourier Prize in High Performance Computing.

See also 
 List of software for Monte Carlo molecular modeling
 Comparison of software for molecular mechanics modeling
 Molecular dynamics
 Molecular geometry
 Molecular design software
 Comparison of force field implementations

References

License

External links
 
 
 
 

Science software
Molecular dynamics software
Monte Carlo molecular modelling software
Washington University in St. Louis